BenchWarmers DVD Magazine is a platform for independent artists and musicians, produced by Tane at NodCraft.com.  The first volume was released in January 2005 featuring music from North Carolina artists such as Maintane, and Living Dead; all footage was provided by Tane and Joe Schmo.  

Volumes 1 and 2 were produced from the NodCraft home office, followed by partial outsourcing of replication for Volumes 3–5, and finally a fully packaged, commercial product in Volumes 6–9.  Joe Schmo and Tane still provide graffiti footage, but others such as 14-2-1, Nonecantest.com, Atlanta Bench, Sone1, FR8Man, Justin Porter, and The Savage Land have joined in.  For Volume 6, Crow provided footage for a tribute to fallen artist HEIST.  The art concept has also expanded, with an animated film, "King Rust," by Matt Maloney featured in Volume 6, productions from Better Days and Agency Films in Volume 7, and short films by Patrick Boivin in Volume 8. Five covers are designed by Lee Wilkie. 

Maintane continues to provide music production, while Volume 3 brought the addition of West coast musicians 26Hrz and Cawzlos.  The list of musicians has grown (Awol One, DJ Pain1, Qwel (Typical Cats), Circus, Coot Dog featuring Shock G, Okwerdz, RA the Rugged Man, Bukue One, Alumni featuring Chino XL, Fall Guys, Reakt 20, Mr. Invisible, J-Live, Tim Barry), . BenchWarmers maintains its roots concept, including musicians from North Carolina and the Southeast such as Living Dead, Juan Huevos, Wolly Vinyl, Odd Numbers, Pens and Needles, Diablo Archer, Ironfist, PUNR, and Foulmouth Jerk featuring Masta Ace.

The interviews in BenchWarmers include: SICR (MOMS, LED), JOME (NSF, RTD), STEL (Losers, Slum Lords), NOIR (Losers, TSL, 123GO), GYSER (MOMS), Buz Blurr, and CAP (MPC); Wolly Vinyl (at the time, the Southeast’s Scribble Jam representative), RA the Rugged Man, J-Live, and DJ Vadim.

References

External links
 Blog of the magazine

Music magazines published in the United States
Quarterly magazines published in the United States
Magazines established in 2005
Magazines published in North Carolina